The plumbeous antbird (Myrmelastes hyperythrus) is a species of bird in the family Thamnophilidae.

It is found in Bolivia, Brazil, Colombia, Ecuador, and Peru. Its natural habitat is subtropical or tropical swamps.

Taxonomy
The plumbeous antbird was described by the English zoologist Philip Sclater in 1855 and given the binomial name Thamnophilus hyperythrus. The specific name combines the Ancient Greek words hupo "beneath" and eruthros "red". Alternatively, the name may be from the Greek word huperuthros for "reddish". The current genus Myrmelastes was introduced by Sclater in 1858 with the plumbeous antbird as the type species.

Description
The male is slaty gray with blackish-gray wings and tail. The wing coverts have conspicuous white spots. Each eye is surrounded by an extensive patch of light blue skin. The female has similar upperparts including the white spots on each wing but is bright orange-rufous below.

The spot-winged antbird (Myrmelastes leucostigma) and the slate-colored antbird (Myrmelastes schistaceus) lack the light blue periorbital skin patches, the white-shouldered antbird (Akletos melanoceps) and the sooty antbird (Hafferia fortis) are blacker than the plumbeous antbird and lack the white spots on the wing.

Breeding
The nest of this species was first described in 2003 based on two nests found in Manú National Park, Peru. They were constructed of black rhizomorphs and covered in dry leaves attached with spider silk. Each nest contained two eggs. These had a pinkish white background which was almost completely covered with dark purplish-red streaks.

References

External links
Xeno-canto: audio recordings of the Plumbeous Antbird

plumbeous antbird
Birds of the Amazon Basin
Birds of the Colombian Amazon
Birds of the Peruvian Amazon
Birds of the Ecuadorian Amazon
Birds of the Bolivian Amazon
plumbeous antbird
plumbeous antbird
Taxonomy articles created by Polbot